Tuiasosopo is a Samoan surname.

 Tuiasosopo Mariota, a tribal leader who helped keep American Samoa from being incorporated into the United States
Mariota Tiumalu Tuiasosopo (1905–1957), American Samoan songwriter
Peter "Navy" Tuiasosopo (born 1963), American Samoan actor

As of early 2014, its most notable bearers are professional athletes all belonging to the same family:

Manu Tuiasosopo (born 1957), American NFL football player
Marques Tuiasosopo (born 1979), American football quarterback and coach, son of Manu
Matt Tuiasosopo (born 1986), American baseball player, son of Manu
Ronaiah Tuiasosopo, perpetrator of the Manti Te'o girlfriend hoax, nephew of Manu

Samoan-language surnames